Poikolainen is a Finnish surname. Notable people with the surname include:

Tomi Poikolainen (born 1961), Finnish Olympic archer
Rauni Poikolainen (born 1962), Finnish long track speed skater
Jutta Poikolainen (born 1963), Finnish Olympic archer, wife of Tomi

Finnish-language surnames